Vessey House may refer to:

Vessey House, alternative name of Caldicott, historic home in Somerset County, Maryland, on the National Register of Historic places
Robert S. Vessey House, historic house in Wessington Springs, South Dakota, on the National Register of Historic places

See also
Vessey School, South Dakota
Vessey (disambiguation)